Noorin Shereef (born 3 April 1999) is an Indian actress from Kollam, Kerala who works in  Malayalam Film Industry.

Filmography

Television serials

References

External links
 

21st-century Indian actresses
1999 births
Indian film actresses
Living people
Malayali people
People from Thrissur district
Actresses from Kerala
Actresses in Malayalam cinema
Actresses in Malayalam television
Actresses in Telugu cinema
Actresses from Thrissur